HTW may refer to:
 Hartwood railway station, in Scotland
 Healing the Wounds, a British charity
 Hear the World Foundation, a Swiss non-profit foundation
 Hochschule für Technik und Wirtschaft Berlin, an applied science university in Berlin, Germany
 Lawrence County Airpark, in Ohio, United States